Comispira mai is a species of sea snail, a marine gastropod mollusk in the family Cochlespiridae.

Description

Distribution
This species occurs in the South China Sea

References

 Li B.-Q. [Bao-Quan] & Li X.-Z. [Xin-Zheng]. (2008). Report on the two subfamilies Clavatulinae and Cochlespirinae (Mollusca: Neogastropoda: Turridae) from the China seas. Zootaxa. 1771: 31-42

External links
 Kantor Yu.I., Fedosov A.E. & Puillandre N. (2018). New and unusual deep-water Conoidea revised with shell, radula and DNA characters. Ruthenica. 28(2): 47-82

mai
Gastropods described in 2008